The 2022 Independent Volleyball Association Tournament was a men's volleyball tournament held by select Independent Universities during the 2022 NCAA Division I & II men's volleyball season. It was held April 22 through April 23, 2022 at Queens University of Charlotte's Curry Arena at the Levine Center. The winner was eligible for one of the two wildcard spots in the 2022 NCAA Volleyball Tournament and was granted the title of Independent Volleyball Association Champion.

Seeds
Eight teams participated in the tournament with Fairleigh Dickinson participating for the first time in their inaugural season. D'Youville and Daemen also returned after missing 2021 due to state-imposed COVID-19 travel restrictions. The seeding was determined by head-to-head matches played during the regular season against the other North and South Region schools.

Coincidentally, this was the final season for all three of the top seeds in IVA North as independents. On September 30, 2021, Fairleigh Dickinson's full-time home of the Northeast Conference (NEC) announced that it would begin sponsoring men's volleyball in the 2023 season, with FDU joined by five other full NEC members. Shortly after the IVA tournament, the NEC announced on May 19 that Daemen and D'Youville would also join its new men's volleyball league for the 2023 season.

Schedule and results

Bracket

References

NCAA Division I & II men's volleyball independents
2022 NCAA Division I & II men's volleyball season